"Lead Me On" is a song written by Leon Copeland, and recorded by American country music artists Conway Twitty and Loretta Lynn as a duet. It was released in September 1971 as the first single and title track from the album Lead Me On. The song was the second number one on the U.S. country singles chart for the pair as a duo.  The single stayed at number one for a single week and spent a total of 15 weeks on the chart.

Chart performance

References

1971 singles
Conway Twitty songs
Loretta Lynn songs
Male–female vocal duets
Song recordings produced by Owen Bradley
Decca Records singles
1971 songs